The Meridiani Planum (alternately Meridiani plain, Meridiani plains, Terra Meridiani, or Terra Meridiani plains) is either a large plain straddling the equator of Mars and covered with a vast number of spherules containing a lot of iron oxide or a region centered on this plain that includes some adjoining land. The plain sits on top of an enormous body of sediments that contains a lot of bound water. The iron oxide in the spherules is crystalline (grey) hematite (Fe203).

The Meridiani Planum is one of the most thoroughly investigated regions of Mars. Many studies were carried out by the scientists involved with NASA's Mars Exploration Rover (MER) Opportunity. Two outstanding features found by these investigations are the actions of water flow and aqueous chemistry in this plain's geological history and, particularly specific to the plain, an abundance and ubiquity of small spherules composed mainly of grey-hematite that sit loosely on top of the plain's soils and underneath embedded inside its sediments. The loose surface spherules were eroded out of the sediments. They are informally called "blueberries". The plain's sediments have extremely high sulfur content (as sulfates) and high phosphate levels.

The boundaries of the Meridiani Planum are not firmly fixed and accepted by the community of Mars planetary scientists. However, the boundaries of the hematite-bearing plain were operationally defined in the late 1990s and early 2000s by the extent of the orbital detection of the plain's surface hematite by the thermal emission spectrometer (TES) on the satellite Mars Global Surveyor. The various names for this region (i.e., Terra Meridiani, Meridiani Planum) started to be used in the published literature in 2002/2003/2004. Each name reflects the coincidental (somewhat arbitrary) fact that the plain straddles the prime meridian for the system of longitude lines introduced for east/west Mars mapping.

The area covered by the detected surface hematite is around 150,000 km2, i.e., larger than Lake Superior (82,000 km2) in North America. Except for transport by large meteor impact, loose surface spherules tend to remain within a few meters of their starting embedded location. The surface hematite spherules and sediments are coextensive in surface area. So, the area extent of the underlying sediments is at least as large as the area of detected surface hematite spherules but likely somewhat larger since, for example, a significant area of surface hematite was covered by ejecta from the Bopolu Crater impact. The typical depth of the underlying sediments is several hundred meters.
The Meridiani plain's sediments overlay older geological formations that appear around the sediments' boundary. The plain's sediments and surface hematite spherules were formed in three geological epochs and by three different sets of geological processes (more below).

The MER Opportunity rover investigated the rim of Endeavour Crater from August 2011 until the rover's demise in 2018. The plain's sediments do not cover this crater rim and are geologically younger than this rim. As such, the rim of Endeavour Crater is distinct from the plain, although it is surrounded by the plain and its sediments.

19th Century Maps
The Meridiani Planum was first observed as part of a larger region that appeared as a distinct dark (low albedo) spot in small telescope images of Mars. Around 1830 the earliest Mars map-makers, Johann Heinrich von Mädler and Wilhelm Beer, 
chose to place the prime meridian for maps of Mars through this dark spot. In the late 1870s, Camille Flammarion called this dark region Sinus Meridiani ("Meridian Bay"). The Meridiani Planum covers the western part of the Sinus Meridiani.

Viking 1 & Viking 2: Smooth Terrain, Sediments, Water
The Viking 1 and Viking 2 missions successfully landed the first landers on Mars at locations far away from the Meridiani Planum. However, both missions also included satellites (operating between 1976 and 1982) that took many images of the surface of Mars from orbit. Viking 1 and Viking 2 satellite images of what is today called the Meridiani Planum (and its adjacent regions) were studied in three works in the 1980s

and again in two 1997 papers
 published in the months between the launch of the Mars Global Surveyor mission and its arrival at Mars. Edgett and Parker noted the smooth terrain of what we now call the Meridiani Planum and realized early that the plain was likely made of sediments and probably had a wet, watery past.

Strategy Impacting the Exploration of Meridiani Planum: Search for Water & Life 
In the 1990s, NASA officials, especially Daniel S. Goldin, wanted to delineate a framework for "faster, better, cheaper" exploration of Mars. In this context, the "Water Strategy" was outlined in 1995/1996. The "Water Strategy" was "to explore and study Mars in three areas: - Evidence of past or present life, - Climate (weather, processes, and history), - Resources (environment and utilization)." All three areas were seen as intimately connected to water.
High priority goals for NASA in the mid-1990s were to gather some evidence for surface water using satellite surveys and to land robotic rovers on the surface to collect detailed local evidence of water and signs of life.

Global Satellite Surveys: Surface Hematite & Water
Two NASA missions arrived at Mars in mid-1997: Mars Pathfinder and Mars Global Surveyor. Mars Pathfinder made the first successful Mars landing in over twenty years and the first-ever deployment of a Mars rover, the small, short-lived Sojourner. Mars Global Surveyor surveyed most of the surface of Mars to map its surface topography, some mineral distributions, and make some other measurements.

Hematite, Water, Plain, Life Potential: A Place to Land a Rover 

An important survey carried out between 1997 and 2002 by the Mars Global Surveyor collected surface hematite levels with the satellite's thermal emissions spectrometer (TES). The TES hematite survey data was turned into the low-resolution map shown in Figure 1a. This map, covering all of Mars, has just one large spot covering a region with high hematite levels. This green, yellow, and red spot straddles the equator and the prime meridian in the middle of Figure 1a.  A higher resolution image of the high-hematite region is shown in Figure 1b.

In early the 2000s, the hematite map of Figure 1b and the confirmation (from the topography mapping done by the Mars Global Surveyor) that this area is a flat plain and relatively easy to land on were the decisive pieces of evidence for choosing the Meridiani Planum as one of the landing sites for NASA's two bigger 
Mars Exploration Rovers (MERs), named Opportunity and Spirit.
The decisiveness for NASA of the hematite map of Figure 1b for choosing the landing site for Opportunity
was due to the fact that NASA was using high hematite levels as proxy evidence for large amounts of liquid water flowing in the region in the past (hematite only forms in the presence of liquid water in geological settings). In 2003, this high-hematite region was a high-priority place to start to search for signs of life on Mars.

Present Day Water at Meridiani Planum (satellite evidence) 

Since 2001, evidence for water at the present-day Meridiani Planum was collected by the High Energy Neutron Detector (HEND) mounted on the Mars Odyssey orbiter. This neutron detector collects signals of "water-equivalent hydrogen" (WEH) over the entire planet. It gradually built up global maps of surface WEH. These maps show that polar and near-polar regions of Mars have the highest levels of surface WEH; although, the Meridiani Planum has relatively high WEH for a non-polar region. The WEH maps are likely to underestimate the present-day water resources at Meridiani Planum since (a) the HEND has a shallow (1 m) penetration depth, (b) the majority of the plain's surface is covered in dehydrated soils, and hematite spherules.

Starting Missions: Opportunity rover and other landers

Starting with Daniel S. Goldin's strategies and NASA's engineering attention to detail, Mars Exploration Rover Opportunity successfully made the "hole-in-one" landing into Eagle Crater at Meridiani Planum on January 24th (PST), 2004. NASA named this landing site the Challenger Memorial Station to honor the final crew of the Space Shuttle Challenger, who died in 1986 when that shuttle broke up in flight.

The Meridiani Planum was also the target landing site for two other missions: Mars Surveyor 2001 Lander and Schiaparelli EDM. However, these other two lander missions were not successful. The Mars Surveyor 2001 Lander was canceled after the failures of the Mars Climate Orbiter and Mars Polar Lander missions, while the Schiaparelli EDM (Entry, Descent, and Landing Demonstrator Module) system lost control during the descent stage and terminally crash-landed on October 19th, 2016. (Schiaparelli EDM was part of the ExoMars program of the European Space Agency.)

==Opportunity'''s Traverse==

Opportunity traveled 28.06 miles (45.16 kilometers) across the Meridiani Planum and around the rim of Endeavour Crater between January 2004 and June 2018. Figure 2 highlights the rover's traverse route (yellow line). The route's position within the Meridiani Planum is shown by the blue line traverse route labeled "OT" in Figure 1b. The journey started on January 25th, 2004, with the landing in Eagle Crater. The rover crossed the plain's sediments and soils and studied many small and medium-sized craters until August 2011, when it reached the rim of the enormous Endeavour Crater. Between August 2011 and June 10th, 2018, it studied the rim of Endeavour (which has different geological features from the plain). The rover's last communication with NASA was on June 10th, 2018. The Opportunity mission was declared ended on February 13th, 2019.

==Opportunitys human-like (Pancam) view of Meridiani Planum==

The Opportunity rover had five cameras. One, the Pancam (panoramic cam), was mounted at the height of 1.5 m, i.e., a height similar to the eye height of most people. The Pancam was used to take scientific data, and it also took images that were approximate true color (ATC) photographs of the rover's surroundings;Bell III, J. F., et al., 2003, "The Mars Exploration Rover Athena Panoramic Camera (Pancam) Investigation," J. Geophys. Res.:Planets, 108 (E12). https://doi.org/10.1029/2003JE002070. that is, the Pancam photographed images close to what people would see if stood in the rover's place. The following pictures, Figure 3 through Figure 10, provide a selection of images that cover the common and outstanding features a person would see standing at locations along Opportunity's traverse of the Meridiani Planum. Click on any image to view at higher resolution. 

The Wide View: A Flat Plain with Smooth or Ripple Soils

Inside Craters: Layered Sediments, Burns Cliff

Iron on the ground: Spherules (Blueberries), Meteorites

Crater Rim Overview (large and small)

The dominant visual impressions at eye level are that:
 Meridiani is a very flat plain.
 The plain is primarily covered in dark soils but with patches of lighter sediment outcrop.
 Vast numbers of small bluish-grey hematite spherules (mostly 1 mm - 6 mm in diameter) sit loosely on the soils and sediment outcrop (many more spherules are on soils than outcrop).
 At most locations, you are close to a visible small crater (5 to 30-meter diameters) - the visible small crater density is 65 to 127 craters per km2 (about 1 per hectare or about 1 per 2.5 acres). (There are plenty of tiny craters with diameters below 5 m.)
 At larger craters (like Endurance and Victoria Craters), the crater walls expose large (stratigraphic) sections of Meridiani sediments in which many sediment layers and partly embedded hematite spherules are visible.
 Scattered across the plain are (usually smallish) ejecta blocks of sediment from crater-forming meteorite impacts.
 The tall rims of enormous craters (like Endeavour and Bopolu Craters) are visible from great distances.
 Large meteorites sitting on soils and top sediment outcrops are somewhat rare but outstanding features.
 The soils come in fields with two main bedform types (i) smooth sheets (these are remarkably flat, and almost no sediment outcrop is visible in smooth sheet fields) and (ii) plains ripples (these are slopped and usually 10 to 40 cm tall and 1.5 to 5 m wide) that are often interspersed with top sediment outcrop.
 There are many sinuous, 1 cm tall "crest" ripples running on top of smooth sheet fields. These crest ripples are made up of sub-millimeter fragments of hematite spherules.

Composition of the Major Materials found at Meridiani Planum

This section covers the composition of the major materials found at the Meridiani plain (i.e., sediments, spherules, soils, and dust). The discoveries and compositions of meteorites and long-distance ejecta are given in the next section. 
A later section covers the geological materials found by Opportunity after August 2011, i.e., around the rim of Endeavour Crater. 

Sediments

The layered sedimentary outcrop rocks exposed in Eagle, Fram, and Endurance caters were examined by the suite of instruments on Opportunity.Klingelhofer, G. et al.  2004.  "Jarosite and Hematite at Meridiani Planum from Opportunity's Mossbauer Spectrometer".  Science:  306. 1740-1745. https://doi.org/10.1126/science.1104653Bell, J., et al.  2004.  "Pancam Multispectral Imaging Results from the Opportunity Rover at Meridiani Planum".  Science:  306.1703-1708. https://doi.org/10.1126/science.1105245  Mature data analysis found the following (broad category) mineral composition of the sediments (excluding embedded spherules): 36-37 wt% hydrated sulfates, 35 wt% hydrated aluminosilicates, 16 wt% basaltic rock, 10 wt% hematite and other oxides, 2 wt% chlorides, and 1-2 wt% phosphates. An outstanding feature of this composition is the extreme levels of the sulfates. These are about 5 times higher than the overlying Meridiani soils, about 20 times higher than in the basalts in Gusev Crater (investigated Spirit, the sibling MER), and even more extreme relative to typical Earth rocks. The principle sulfates are hydrated magnesium sulfates (e.g., kieserite & epsomite), hydrated calcium sulfates (e.g., bassanite & gypsum), and jarosite (a complicated hydrated sulfate containing iron and probably potassium or sodium); the chloride salts include halite and bischofite. Detecting jarosite was a surprise, and its presence significantly constrains the possible geochemical pathways leading to the formation of Meridiani sediments.Water Content? 
An outstanding unknown is the amount of residual water in the layered sediments today. Answers from direct measurement by the rover Opportunity were not possible because the rover's instruments could not detect water or hydrogen. However, in 2005, Clark et al. gave a range of 6 wt% to 22 wt% based on an indirect geochemical argument. Further, the actual water content should be higher than the water equivalent hydrogen (WEH) measurements made by the neutron detector orbiting on Mars Odyssey (due to the shallow (1m) penetration depth of the neutron detector and the layer of water-poor top soil covering most areas of Meridiani). In 2005 the measured WEH level at Meridiani was 7 wt%, but continued neutron detection produced a 2018 WEH map indicating 9-10 wt% WEH across Meridiani. 

There is a small field of scientific study concentrating on how hydration levels of hydrated magnesium and calcium sulfates vary with temperature at Martain atmosphere pressures.Peterson, R. C., Nelson, W., Madu, B., and Shurvell, H. G. (2007). "Meridianiite: A new mineral
species observed on Earth and predicted to exist on Mars." Am. Minerol., 92(10).
https://doi.org/10.2138/am.2007.2668 Grevel, K. D., Majzlan, J., Benisek, A., Dachs, E., Steiger, M., Fortes, A. D., and Marler, B. (2012).
"Experimentally Determined Standard Thermodynamic Properties of Synthetic MgSO 4.4H2O
(Starkeyite) and MgSO4.3H2O: A Revised Internally Consistent Thermodynamic Data Set for
Magnesium Sulfate Hydrates." Astrobiology, 12(11), 1042–1053. https://doi.org/10.1089/ast.2012.0823  At Martian pressures, these studies readily extracted water from magnesium sulfates with various levels of hydration using applied temperatures between 50 oC and 200 oC. They also observed a hyper-hydrated magnesium sulfate on Earth that they called meridianiite (after Meridiani Planum), with the formula MgSO4.11H2O, which decomposes to epsomite, MgSO4.7H2O, and water at 2 oC.

Opportunity's Alpha particle X-ray spectrometer (APXS) found rather high levels of phosphorus in the rocks. Since the solubility of phosphorus is related to the solubility of uranium, thorium, and rare-earth elements, it was suggested these other metals are also enriched in Meridiani outcrop sediments.

Spherules

Early Spherule Results
Early on, Opportunity's Mössbauer spectrometer took data that determined that the iron mineral component of these spherules is dominated by hematite.Morris, R. V., et al. (2006). "Mössbauer mineralogy of rock, soil, and dust at Meridiani Planum, Mars: Opportunity's
journey across sulfate-rich outcrop, basaltic sand and dust, and hematite lag deposits." J. GeoPhys. Res. Planets, 111, E12S15. https://doi.org/10.1029/2006JE002791. However, the Mössbauer spectrometer provided no information about the mineral components of these spherules that do not contain iron. 

The "berry bowl" experiment took alpha particle X-ray spectrometer (APXS) readings of two sampling targets just centimeters apart: One had no (zero or one) spherules in the spectrometer's field of view (FOV), while the other had around 25 spherules in the FOV. Figure 11 shows the adjacent "berry bowl" sampling targets. The APXS results indicated there was noticeably more iron in the target with ~25 spherules relative to the target with 0 or 1 spherules. Based on this and similar experiments, several unreviewed conference abstracts claimed (deliberately not cited here) 
that hematite dominated the composition of the spherules and some published papers cited these conference claims. However, there were reasons to be cautious. The instruments detected mixed signals from sampling targets that included signals not only from the spherules but also from dust and rock (in the "berry bowl" experiment) or dust and soils (in other composition data collections). In 2006, Morris et al. showed that the methods used by some researchers to pick out the spherule composition signal from the dust and soil signals were flawed and that such methods could do no more than constrain the iron oxide content of the spherules to between 24 wt% and 100 wt% (that is, almost no constraint at all).

Later Spherule Results
A 2008 paper published the result of a clever experiment that showed Opportunity's mini-TES (thermal emission spectrometer) could not detect any silicate minerals in the spherules. This non-detection constrained silicate levels in spherules to less than 10 wt% and probably below 8 wt%. This result is helpful since the APXS data shows a strong anti-correlation between silicates and iron oxide in the spherules -
so low silicate levels indicate high iron oxide levels. 

A recent paper used the mini-TES's non-detection of silicates and some improved data analysis methods to find over 340,000 allowable standard oxide chemical compositions for the spherules (allowable = consistent with the silicate non-detection). The lowest and highest weight percentages for the iron oxide content in these allowable spherule compositions were, respectively, 79.5 wt% and 99.8 wt%. While, for the large majority of the allowable compositions, the iron oxide contents in the spherules were between 85 wt% and 96 wt%; further, the nickel content was always close to 0.3 wt%, a group of five standard oxides (MgO, Na2O, P2O5, SO3, and Cl)  each had content above trace-level with a combined group content of 6.8 +/- 2.4 wt%, the SiO2 levels ranged between 8 wt% and 0 wt%, and the other eight APXS standard oxides had either 0 wt% content or only trace level content.

Soils

The underlying soils at Meridiani Planum are similar to those at Gusev Crater, Ares Vallis, and Gale Crater; although, the levels of sulfates in Meridiani soils are noticeably higher than other locations. At Meridiani Planum, the soils are armored with a thin top layer of hematite spherules with their distinct composition (not found at Gusev Crater, Ares Vallis, and Gale Crater). This layering of spherules (and spherule fragments) on top, with basaltic soils below, is shown in Figure 12.

Most of the underlying soil consists of basaltic material but mixed with varying amounts of dust and sulfate-rich ejecta debris from the sediments. A typical mineral composition for basaltic Meridiani soils is 40 wt% plagioclase, 35 wt% pyroxenes, 15 wt% amorphous glasses, 10 wt% olivine, and around 5 wt% sulfates and oxides. Standard oxide compositions for typical basaltic soils are 44-46 wt% SiO2, 18-19 wt% FeO + Fe2O3,  9-10 wt% Al2O3,  7.4 wt% MgO,  6.9 wt% CaO2,  5.8 wt% SO3,  2.2 wt% Na2O,  ~5 wt%  other oxides (total).Olsen, R. M., 2022, "Searching Mass-Balance Analysis to Find the Composition of
Martian Blueberries," Minerals, 12, 777. https://doi.org/10.3390/min12060777 

Dust

Dust covers everything all over Mars and the composition of this dust is essentially uniform everywhere, due to the many dust storms over Mars, including global dust storms every few years. 

Opportunity's APXS measurement of a commonly referenced dust-covered sampling target, MontBlanc_LeHauches, gives a dust composition that is largely basaltic in character with the following weight perecentages for the standard oxides: 45.3 wt% SiO2, 17.6 wt% Fe0, 9.2 wt% Al2O3, 7.6 wt% MgO, 7.3 wt% SO3,  6.6 wt% CaO, 2.2 wt% Na20,  1.0 TiO2, 0.9 wt% P2O5, and a total of 2.0 wt% for the other seven standard oxides.

A Mössbauer spectrum was made of the dust that gathered on Opportunitys capture magnet.  The results suggested that the magnetic component of the dust was titanomagnetite, rather than just plain magnetite, as was once thought.  A small amount of olivine was detected which was interpreted as indicating a long arid period on the planet.  On the other hand, a small amount of hematite that was present meant that there may have been liquid water for a short time in the early history of the planet.

Discoveries of Meteorites & Long Distance Ejecta

Meteorites
Opportunity found six large iron-nickel meteorites just sitting on the plains (Heat Shield Rock (shown in Figure 8), Block Island, Shelter Island, Mackinac Island, Oileán Ruaidh, and Ireland), 
although these six may originate from fewer impacts (i.e., an original meteor broke into pieces). 
Examination with the Miniature Thermal Emission Spectrometer (Mini-TES), Mossbauer spectrometer, and APXS led researchers to classify Heat Shield Rock as an IAB meteorite with close to 93 wt% iron content and 7 wt% nickel content (mostly in metallic form). Heat Shield Rock (see Figure 8) was the first meteorite recognized on another planet. 
(The other MER, Spirit, found two rocks in Gusev Crater, "Allan Hills" and "Zhong Shan," that may be iron meteorites.)

The top layers of the plain's soils contain a noticeable content (~1 wt%) of small-particle, iron-nickel meteoritic material 
 - many iron-nickel meteorites disintegrate during descent and impact, and these pieces were too small for the Pancam to identify. 

Stony meteorites are more challenging to identify than iron-nickel meteorites. However, the cobble named "Fig Tree Barberton" and three others in the "Barberton group" are thought to be stony or stony-iron meteorites (mesosiderite silicate),.

Opportunity studied nine cobbles in the "Arkansas Group" that were breccias displaying evidence of material melting from heat generated by meteorite impacts. 

Long Distance Ejecta
The rover found two odd boulders with mineralogies significantly different from the plain's common sediment rocks.
One rock, "Bounce Rock," contains mainly pyroxene and plagioclase but no olivine. It closely resembled a part, Lithology B, of the shergottite meteorite EETA 79001, a meteorite on Earth known to have come from Mars.  Bounce rock received its name by being bounced on by the airbags of Opportunity'''s lander.Squyres et al., 2006, "Overview of the Opportunity Mars Exploration Rover Mission to Meridiani Planum - Eagle Crater to Purgatory Ripple," J. Geophys. Res., 111, E12S12, https://doi.org/10.1029/2006JE002771,  The other rock, "Marquette Island," is believed to have originated deep inside the crust of Mars. Both "Bounce Rock" and "Marquette Island" are considered to be ejecta from large crater impacts occurring off the plain at large distances from where these rocks were found by the rover.

Geological history

The history of geological change at Meridiani Planum fits into three epochs with distinct processes. These three eras of change at Meridiani align reasonably well with the three standard epochs for the whole planet, i.e., the Noachian, Hesperian, and Amazonian epochs. 

Noachian River Flows

Prior to the formation of Meridiani's defining sediments, in the wet Noachian (named for the biblical Noah) more than about ~3.7 billion years ago, liquid water was present and plentiful enough to form river channels that bought and deposited large quantities of basaltic silt to the current Meridiani region. Edgett and Parker could barely discern some of these river valleys in the Viking orbiter images from the 1970s. However, they are easy to see in thermal inertia images taken in orbit by Mars Odyssey and reproduced in Figure 13 (click on it for higher resolution). These river channels took water from the higher ground in the southeast (lower right of Figure 13) toward the northwest and down to the present-day Meridiani Planum. The river valleys seen in Figure 13 terminate abruptly as they flow into the Meridiani's massive formation of sediments.

Current evidence points to the sloping ground (necessary for the river flows) being created by a giant tilt in the surface of Terra Meridiani Mars caused by the emergence of the enormous Tharsis Plateau and the vast volcanoes of Tharsis several thousand kilometers away.Banerdt, W.B., and Golombek, M.P., "Tectonics of the Tharsis region of Mars: Insights from MGS topography and
gravity," Lunar and Planetary Science Conference XXXI, Houston, Texas, Lunar and Planetary Institute, 2000, 2038.pdf

Formation of Today's Sediments & Embedded Spherules

From around the late-Noachian/early-Hesperian to sometime around 3.5 billion years ago, the layered sediments deposited in the earlier Noachian epoch were transformed. This transformation probably included a significant additional deposition of high-sulfur-content material of volcanic origin. The change certainly included aqueous geochemistry that was acidic and salty, as well as rising & falling water levels: Features providing evidence include cross-bedded sediments, the presence of vugs (cavities), and embedded hematite spherules that cut across sediment layers, additionally the presence of large amounts of magnesium sulfate and other sulfate-rich minerals such as jarosite and chlorides. Jarosite formation requires aqueous acidic conditions below pH 3. 

Figures 14 and 15 show Microscopic Imager close-up images of the sediment rock matrix that appeared (cropped) in a prestigious paper. Figure 14 illustrates the four physical constituents of sediment outcrop: (i) the sedimentary layers containing a lot of basaltic sand particles; (ii) the embedded hematite spherules; (iii) fine-grained, sulfate-rich cement (in most parts of the outcrop); (iv) vug cavities (that are thought to be molds for crystals of, for example, hydrated sulfates). Figure 15 images a similar sediment outcrop surface to Figure 14. However, Opportunity's Rock Abrasion Tool abraded this surface. Such abrasions showed that (a) the sediment layers are very soft and easy to cut, and (b) the hematite spherules have uniform internal structures.

The "diagenetic" transformation (i.e., change by water-rock interactions) to today's sediments involved a significant shift in water flows in the region. The inflows from rivers became less and less, and in this period, the dominant water movements in the sediments became vertical movements with rising and falling aquifer levels. 
At least one model of global Martian hydrology accounts for the historical shift in water flows at Meridiani Planum. This model links Meridiani's change in water flows to activity in the volcanic Tharsis region. With the vertical aquifer flows, it is believed that (playa) lakes repeatedly formed and disappeared as the aquifer levels rose and fell. (The dry area around Utah's Great Salt Lake is a playa.) The Opportunity team found minerals ("evaporites") that typically form when salty water evaporates; these evaporites cemented together other components of the sediment (such as basaltic particles and the spherules).

McLennan and his students constructed a geochemical model that generates hematite within a context like the Meridiani sediment.Hurowitz, J. A., Fischer, W. W., Tosca, N. J., and Milliken, R. E., 2010, "Origin of acidic surface waters and the evolution
of atmospheric chemistry on early Mars," Nature Geoscience, 3, 323–326.
https://doi.org/10.1038/NGEo831  The hematite formed into spherules by concretion. The concretion process to form near spherical balls (spherules) of hematite probably occurred by diffusion of the hematite through the sedimentary rock matrix (the hematite still in the rock matrix probably fixed in place when moveable water disappeared).

The results of these transformations are still largely intact today. The main subsequent changes just affected the top layers of the Meridiani sediments (more below).

Crater Degradation, Formation of Soils & Loose Spherules

The period of rising and falling aquifer levels ceased, and no water flowed on Meridiani Planum thereafter. Although, when this happened is poorly understood. Estimates include around 3.5 billion years ago and about 3 billion years ago. The only water left at the plain was and is bound in rocks.

Erosion with water flows in earlier eras was much faster than in this last (and present) arid epoch.
However, erosion did not stop. Other much slower erosional processes continued and became the primary agents of change to the plain. This slower change was and is driven by meteorite impacts, the wind, and gravity. Over the hard-to-grasp eon of around three billion years, meteorite impacts and the wind formed the sandy top soils and loose hematite spherules and sorted these into the layered soil bedforms that Opportunity's Pancam photographed, and we can now see.Sullivan, R., Anderson, R., Biesiadecki, J., Bond, T., and Stewart, H., 2011, "Cohesions, friction
angles, and other physical properties of Martian regolith from Mars Exploration Rover wheel
trenches and wheel scuffs." J. Geophys. Res.: Planets, 116, E02006.
https://doi.org//10.1029/2010JE003625. 

The meteorite, gravity, and wind-driven processes work like this:
 Over billions of years, meteorite impacts created many craters on the plain.
 There were enough small (5 to 30 m diameter) craters created in the eon of around three billion years to cover, on average, the whole plain once. Although, each small crater degraded and disappeared in about 25 million years or less, and only about 0.7% of the plain's area is presently covered in small craters.
 Each meteorite impact produces large numbers of blocks of sediment material in the crater rim and as ejecta around the crater: See, for example, Concepcion Crater in Figure 10 and the tiny Granada Crater (on the right side) of Figure 9.
 Most of the initial sediment blocks project above the surrounding material (by a few centimeters or more) and are exposed to saltating sand (i.e., wind-driven, bouncing sand).
 The saltating sand erodes the soft, easy-to-erode parts of the sediment matrix in the projecting blocks.
 These blocks are either completely eroded or erode until they become smooth and no longer project into saltating sand.
 This block erosion creates dust particles and turns embedded spherules into loose spherules (more below).
 The dust particles are blown off the plain and become part of the global dust.
 The sulfates preferentially turn into dust and are transported off the plain by the wind.
 The larger basalt sand particles, spherules fragments, and hematite spherules remain in place on the plain.
 Wind, gravity, and size-sorting created the soil bedforms from the basaltic sands, spherule fragments, and spherules.
 With the aid of gravity and wind, the original (small) crater holes are gradually filled in (with material from eroded rim blocks and other local erosion material), and the plain is returned to a flat state.

Phil Christensen outlined these processes in 2004, soon after Opportunity landed. Later, more in-depth research (with more years of data from Opportunity) confirmed the above processes and added details.Olsen, R., M., 2021, "Iron Oxide Harvesting on Mars," In AIAA ASCEND 2021, Las Vegas, Nevada & Virtual.
https://doi.org/10.2514/6.2021-4037  Christensen's rapid assessment of the erosional processes was probably connected to his correct 2000 prediction that the plain's surface material is soft and easy-to-erode (friable). And that prediction was made after orbiter data showed that Meridiani Planum is very smooth and that small craters degrade and disappear more rapidly than in adjoining regions.

Opportunity found that Meridiani sediments are soft and friable. More satellite and rover data showed that erosion rates on the Meridiani Planum are both very slow (relative to water-related erosion on Earth and early Mars) but also extremely fast (about 30 to 300 times faster) when compared to other arid regions of Mars (such as Gusev Crater). 

Figure 17 shows hematite spherules as they turned from being embedded spherules into loose spherules. In Figure 17, right around seven blocks of eroding sediment ejecta (from the tiny Granada Crater) are rings surrounding these blocks where these rings are formed by locally high surface concentrations of loose spherules and caused by additional loose spherules eroding out of the blocks of sediment. Figure 17 is cropped from Figure 7, which was, in turn, cropped from Figure 9. Click and enlarge Figure 17 to see the high-density rings of spherules. 

Size & Surface Density of Hematite Spherules (Blueberries)

Spherule Size

The size of the hematite spherules varied by location along Opportunity's traverse of Meridiani Planum. The figures below illustrate this variation. Figures 18, 19, and 20 show loose surface spherules at Eagle Crater (the rover's landing site in January 2004), 500m northwest of Victoria Carter (August 2007), and 200m outside the rim of Endeavour crater (late July 2011). The straight-line distance between the sampling targets shown in Figures 18 and 20 is about 23 km (the rover's route between the two targets was 33 km). Figure 20 features one of the largest spherules photographed on the plain by Opportunity's Microscopic Imager; it is 8.3 mm in diameter. 

Figure 21 shows spherule fragments (or very small spherules) in a "crest ripple". These were right next to much larger spherules lying on top of smooth sandy soils and within a few meters of the trench shown in Figure 12. The top section of Figure 12 shows two crest ripples and the much larger spherules spread out between the crest ripples on top of the soils. The wide view Figure 3 also shows crest ripples as the sinuous wind-formed lines on top of the smooth sandy soil bedforms.
 

Numbers of Hematite Spherules & Loose Spherule Surface Density

There are no peer-reviewed published estimates of the number of loose hematite spherules on Meridiani's soils or embedded hematite spherules in the plain's sediments. However, the reader can sense how mind-boggling big those numbers are with a photograph of an area of soil with a typical surface density of the hematite spheres. Such a photograph has been published. 

Figures 22 and 23 are true-color and false-color versions of the photo. The spherules are easier to see in the published false-color version (Figure 23). Click on it to enlarge it. The sampling target of Figures 22 & 23 had 29% coarse hematite coverage. The range of coverage among similar targets was 10% to 40%. These targets were sampled over a wide area, between Sol 70 (2004-04-04) and Sol 999 (2007-11-15). 

The parts of the plain Opportunity studied are not special: Compared to the rest of Meridiani Planum, they do not have high surface hematite levels. To see this, look at the plain's surface hematite map (Figure 1b) and the small blue line (labeled OT ) indicating the route of Opportunity's Traverse of the plain. 

The mind-bogglingness of the number of loose hematite spherules hits when Figures 22 & 23 are extrapolated to the plain's whole surface area (about 150,000 km2): 150,000 km2 is close to 2/3's the area of the main island of Japan (Honshu) and also 72% the area of the main island of the UK (Great Britain), it is also bigger than the land areas of 30 of the 50 states of the USA.

The number of embedded spherules (in the plain's sediments) is probably much higher than the number of loose spherules (on soils). Since (1) the estimates of the erosion depth of original sediment needed to produce the loose spherules are less than 1 meter, while (2) the typical depths of the plain's sediments are several hundred meters.

Summary of Evidence of Water

Many lines of evidence indicate water either at Meridiani Planum today or in the distant past. 
Before giving a short summary of the major lines of evidence already provided above, a few more are introduced.

Some rocks showed small layers (laminations) with shapes only made by gently flowing water.  The first such laminations were found in a rock called "The Dells."  Geologists would say that the cross-stratification showed festoon geometry from transport in subaqueous ripples.  Figure 24 illustrates cross-stratification, also called cross-bedding.

The concentration of the element bromine in rocks was highly variable. This may be evidence of water. Bromine is very soluble and may have moved with water flows. Thin-film water frost deposition may have concentrated bromine in certain spots.

In mid-2004, thermal inertia signals (collected by the Mars Global Surveyors TES) for "light-toned outcrop" (that is, outcrops of the plain's sediments) were found all over Meridiani Planum and also over extensive adjacent regions to the west, north, and east of the plain. Noting early results from Opportunity that the outcrop showed evidence of "long-term water interaction locally at the landing site", ref suggested the entire region with light-toned outcrop displayed evidence of past water. 

Major Lines of Evidence for Water: 

The orbiting satellite evidence includes (A) the TES spectra for surface hematite (mapped in Figure 1b) since hematite only forms in watery conditions, and (B) the orbiting neutron detector's finding of fairly high levels of WEH over the plain and the adjacent regions (to the west, north, and east). 

The deposition of sediments and the visible dried-up river valleys flowing into the plain's sediments are both strong evidence of ancient water flows in the Meridiani region. 

The stratigraphic details of plain's sediments provide several lines of evidence for water, including cross-bedded sediments, the presence of vugs (cavities), and embedded hematite spherules that cut across sediment layers. 
The geochemical details of plain's sediments provide more lines of evidence for water, including the presence of large amounts of magnesium sulfate and other sulfate-rich minerals such as jarosite as well as chlorides.

Endeavour Crater 

At Endeavour Crater, Opportunity investigated the Homestake Vein, the Matijevic formation containing smectites, the Shoemaker formation composed of breccia at the crater rim, the Grasberg formation composed of clastics, and much else.

Homestake Vein:

In December 2011, Opportunity had driven onto the rim of Endeavour Crater and found a white vein identified as being pure gypsum.
Tests confirmed that it contained calcium, sulfur, and water.
It was formed when water carrying gypsum in solution deposited the mineral in a crack in the rock.
The vein is called "Homestake." It is in a zone where the sulfate-rich sedimentary bedrock of the plains meets older, volcanic bedrock exposed at the rim of Endeavour.

North of Meridiani Planum
A broad region north of the Meridiani plain displays layered features from orbit. 

A detailed discussion of layering with many Martian examples can be found in Sedimentary Geology of Mars.

Craters on Meridiani Planum

Ada Crater
Airy Crater – 40 kilometre (km) in diameter and about 375 km west-southwest of Opportunity
Airy-0 – Lies within the Airy crater, and defines the Martian Prime Meridian
Argo Crater – Visited by Opportunity
Beagle Crater – Visited by Opportunity
Beer Crater
Bopolu Crater
Concepcion Crater - Visited by Opportunity 
Crommelin Crater
Eagle Crater – Landing site of Opportunity (diameter 30 meters)
Emma Dean Crater – Visited by Opportunity
Endeavour Crater – Visited by Opportunity
Endurance Crater – Visited by Opportunity
Erebus Crater – Visited by Opportunity
Firsoff Crater - Candidate landing site for 2020 rover mission
Iazu Crater
Mädler Crater
Santa Maria Crater - Visited by Opportunity
Victoria Crater – Visited by Opportunity (diameter 750 meters)
Vostok Crater – Visited by Opportunity

See also
Geography of Mars
List of plains on Mars

References

External links

NASA's Opportunity Rover Team present a 3.52 min overview video of the rover's mission on the Meridiani Planum 
Google Mars zoomable map – centered on Meridiani Planum
The sedimentary rocks of Sinus Meridiani: Five key observations from data acquired by the Mars Global Surveyor and Mars Odyssey orbiters 
ESA -  Meridiani Planum
High resolution video by Seán Doran of overflight of layered area of Meridiani Planum

Albedo features on Mars
Plains on Mars
Arabia quadrangle
Mars Exploration Rover mission